John II, Count of Oldenburg (died ) was Count of Oldenburg from 1275 until around 1301. He was the son of Christian III, Count of Oldenburg. His mother was either Hedwig von Oldenburg in Wildeshausen or Jutta of Bentheim.

Marriages and issue
John married twice. His first marriage was to Elisabeth, the daughter of John, Duke of Brunswick and Lunenburg and Liutgard von Holstein-Itzehoe. His second marriage was to Countess Hedwig of Diepholz. John had five children: 
 Christian IV, Count of Oldenburg
 John III, Count of Oldenburg, married Mechtild (Matilda) of Bronckhorst 
 Conrad I, Count of Oldenburg
 Maurice of Oldenburg (killed in action in 1368 near Blexen), Dean (Domdechant) of Bremen Cathedral, Diocesan Administrator of the Archdiocese of Bremen (1345–1362), Archbishop Elect of Bremen (1348, papally refused) and coadjutor of Bremen (1348–1360)
 Gisela of Oldenburg; married Gerhard III, Count of Hoya

References

Counts of Oldenburg
13th-century births
1310s deaths
Year of birth unknown
Year of death uncertain